Chazz Surratt (born February 16, 1997) is an American football middle linebacker for the New York Jets of the National Football League (NFL). He played college football at North Carolina, where he began his career as a quarterback, and was drafted by the Minnesota Vikings in the third round of the 2021 NFL Draft.

Early years
Surratt attended East Lincoln High School in Denver, North Carolina.  A highly regarded high school quarterback, Surratt was a two-time first-team Associated Press all-state selection.  During his senior year, Surratt was named Parade National Player of the Year and a Parade All-American, as well as the Associated Press offensive player of the year in North Carolina.

College career
Recruited by Tar Heel coach Larry Fedora to the University of North Carolina at Chapel Hill to play quarterback, Surratt redshirted during his first season with the program. He was named the starting quarterback during his redshirt freshman season, replacing graduate transfer Brandon Harris who had struggled to begin the season. Surratt himself struggled with inconsistency and injury throughout 2017, only appearing in nine games, starting seven. After a suspension to start the 2018 season, Surratt became the backup to Nathan Elliott. He appeared in one game during his redshirt sophomore season, sustaining a season-ending injury against Miami.

When Head Coach Mack Brown returned before the 2019 season, Surratt elected to make the switch to linebacker prior to his redshirt junior season rather than transfer to another school for an opportunity to continue to play quarterback. Carolina had just signed the highly-touted Sam Howell and also had quarterbacks Cade Fortin and Jace Ruder on the roster, giving Surratt slim chances to crack the quarterback depth chart. The move to linebacker proved to be a revelation, and Surratt had a successful season highlighted by a game-winning interception against rival Duke.  In the 2019 season, Surratt started and played in all 13 games and had 115 tackles, 15 tackles for loss, 6.5 sacks, 1 interception, 1 forced fumble, and 1 fumble recovery. After the completion of the season, Surratt was named first-team All-ACC at the linebacker position. In his redshirt senior season in 2020, Surratt played in 11 games and finished with 91 tackles, 7.5 tackles for loss, 6 sacks, 1 interception, 1 forced fumble, and 1 fumble recovered.

Surratt opted out of participating in the Orange Bowl against Texas A&M, in order to prepare for the 2021 NFL Draft.

Professional career

Minnesota Vikings
Surratt was drafted in the third round (78th overall) of the 2021 NFL Draft by the Minnesota Vikings.

2021 season: Rookie year

Entering his inaugural training camp in the NFL, Surratt competed for a starting inside linebacker job against Nick Vigil and Blake Lynch.  At the conclusion of the preseason, head coach Mike Zimmer named Surratt a backup inside linebacker behind Anthony Barr, Eric Kendricks, and Nick Vigil.  

Surratt finished his rookie season playing in 9 games (0 starts) and played exclusively on special teams with zero defensive snaps.

2022 season

Surratt competed for a backup inside linebacker job in training camp against rookie Brian Asamoah.  However, he struggled in the Vikings' preseason games and was seen as an improper fit in the team's new defensive scheme.   

Surratt was waived on August 30, 2022.

New York Jets
On September 1, 2022, Surratt was signed to the New York Jets practice squad. He signed a reserve/future contract on January 9, 2023.

Personal life
Surratt's younger brother, Sage Surratt, was an All-Conference wide-receiver at Wake Forest University.

References

External links
Minnesota Vikings bio
North Carolina Tar Heels bio
Sports Reference College Football Statistics

1997 births
Living people
Players of American football from North Carolina
North Carolina Tar Heels football players
People from Denver, North Carolina
American football quarterbacks
American football linebackers
All-American college football players
Minnesota Vikings players
New York Jets players